TSS Great Southern was a passenger vessel built for the Great Western Railway in 1902.

History

She was built by Laird Brothers in Birkenhead for the Great Western Railway as a twin-screw steamer for the Irish Sea ferry service between Milford Haven and Waterford. She was a sister ship to TSS Great Western.

In 1910 she ran aground on shingle at Parkswood, Waterford River during a fog. She ran aground again in the same river in 1929.

Later in her career she operated occasionally from Weymouth on the Channel Islands service.

In 1934 she was sold for scrapping by John Cashmore of Newport, Monmouthshire.

References

1902 ships
Passenger ships of the United Kingdom
Steamships of the United Kingdom
Ships built on the River Mersey
Ships of the Great Western Railway